The 1941 Ohio State Buckeyes football team was an American football team that represented Ohio State University in the 1941 Big Ten Conference football season. The Buckeyes compiled a 6–1–1 record and outscored opponents 167–110. In Paul Brown's first season as head coach, the Buckeyes tied Michigan.  The season opening game versus Missouri was the debut of the Split-T offense, developed by Tigers' coach Don Faurot.

Schedule

Coaching staff
 Paul Brown, head coach, first year

1942 NFL draftees

References

Ohio State
Ohio State Buckeyes football seasons
Ohio State Buckeyes football